Earl of Airlie was an 1833 steam locomotive designed and built by J and C Carmichael for the 4ft 6in gauge Dundee and Newtyle Railway, with a 0-2-4 wheel arrangement and a tender. It was the first steam passenger locomotive in Scotland and the first locomotive in the United Kingdom to have a bogie.

A second locomotive, of the same design, Lord Wharncliffe was completed shortly after Earl of Airlie. A third 0-2-4, Trotter, was provided by James Stirling & Co. in 1834, to a similar but sightly smaller design.

No other locomotives ever used the 0-2-4 arrangement.

Background 

The first railway locomotive to run in Scotland, The Duke, was introduced on the Kilmarnock and Troon Railway in 1817 or early 1818, to haul coal. It was not a success.

The first locomotive in the world with a bogie, invented by John B. Jervis  was Experiment (later renamed Brother Jonathan), a 4-2-0 design for the Mohawk and Hudson Railroad in the United States, in 1832.

The Dundee and Newtyle Railway opened in part in December 1831, and in full on 3 April 1832. It was built to 4ft 6in ("Scotch") gauge and converted to 4ft 8½in (standard) gauge in 1849, having been leased to the Dundee and Perth Railway in 1846. The Dundee and Perth Railway was in turn absorbed by the Scottish Central Railway in 1863.

Design 

Earl of Airlie had an 0-2-4 (Whyte notation) wheel arrangement, meaning that it had no leading wheels, two powered driving wheels on one axle, and four trailing wheels on two axles. These latter pair of axles were on the bogie. This was the first use of a bogie on a locomotive in the United Kingdom.

It was delivered from its maker, J and C Carmichael, on 22 September 1833, along with a separate tender comprising a wagon with a water-barrel affixed, costing £30.

Similar locomotives 

It was delivered on 25 September 1833.

Name 

The Earl of Airlie at the time of the locomotive's introduction was David Ogilvy  (1785–1849), the 9th Earl, who had succeeded to the title in 1819.

Lord Wharncliffe was James Stuart-Wortley (1776–1845) , the 1st Baron Wharncliffe.

Both men were directors of the railway company, as well as being landowners in the area through which the line ran.

The locomotives were numbered by the Dundee and Newtyle Railway as No.1, No.2 and No.3, in order of delivery.

The first two were renumbered as No.10 and No.11 respectively, in 1850, by the Dundee and Perth Railway.

Later use 

Earl of Airlie and Lord Wharncliffe were converted to run on standard gauge when the line was converted in 1849 (Trotter was scraped), under the auspices of the Dundee and Perth Railway.

The two regauged locomotives operated until 1854. After being taken out of service, Earl of Airlie was used as a stationary engine, pumping water at Errol railway station. Lord Wharncliffe was used for similar purposes at the company's workshop at Seabraes, Dundee.

Around a decade later, Alexander Allan, who became locomotive superintendent of the Scottish Central Railway in 1863, recognised its significance of Earl of Airlie.  He had it removed, cleaned, cosmetically restored (albeit with the wrong type of buffers; sprung, instead of horse-hair filled), painted, and then photographed. However, it was not preserved.

Model 

An accurate ¾-inch scale (3½ inch gauge) working model of Earl of Airlie made by H. Thomas was awarded a Bronze Medal at the Model Engineer Exhibition of 1981. It was sold by auction by Christie's in April 2003 for a hammer price of £5,875.

Notes

References

External links 
 Animation of the locomotive showing the working of the bell cranks.

Early steam locomotives
Individual locomotives of Great Britain
0-2-4 locomotives
Steam locomotives of Great Britain
History of Dundee
1833 introductions